Lino da Cruz Sousa (born 19 January  2005) is a professional footballer who plays as a defender for Premier League club Arsenal. Born in Portugal, he is a youth international for England.

Early life
Born in Portugal, when he was eight-years-old he moved with his family from Lisbon to Wolverhampton. Lino played for Aspire FC before joining the academy at West Bromwich Albion.

Career
Lino Sousa played regularly for the West Bromwich Albion team that reached the semi-finals of the 2021 FA Youth Cup despite only being 16-years-old himself at the time. Sousa joined Arsenal from West Brom in January 2022. Such was his progress at Arsenal there was discussions in the summer of 2022 to fast-track Lino Sousa into first team training. Lino made such an impression that it was thought his development was part of the reason Arsenal allowed Joel Lopez to return to his native Spain in the summer of 2022 despite Lopez being a regular for the under-23 side and contributing two goals and five assists from left back.

Sousa was taken on the first team pre-season training camp to Germany in the summer of 2022. In September 2022 he was confirmed as being included in the Arsenal first team training and their travelling party as they prepared for the away UEFA Europa League match against FC Zurich. He made his first Premier League match day squad on 18 September, 2022 against Brentford and was then named among the match-day substitutes for Arsenal.

International career
Sousa has played for England at age group level but is also still eligible to represent Portugal, the country of his birth. In September 2022 he was called up to the England national under-18 football team for the first time.

References

External links
 

2005 births
Living people
Footballers from Lisbon
English footballers
England youth international footballers
Portuguese footballers
English people of Angolan descent
Portuguese people of Angolan descent
Association football midfielders
Arsenal F.C. players
Portuguese emigrants to England